The 2011 Basra bombings were three bombing attacks in a busy market in Basra, Iraq, on November 24, 2011, that killed at least 19 people and wounded at least 65 more. The first bomb, concealed in a motorbike, exploded initially while the two other bombs exploded as security forces responded to the scene. As a result most of the casualties in the bombing were troops and policemen. It was the second triple bombing in Basra in just over three weeks.  Ali al-Maliki, the head of the Basra provincial council security committee said, "The fingerprints of Baathists and al Qaeda are clear in these explosions." The bombing took place one day before a major energy conference was due to take place.

See also
 List of terrorist incidents, 2011

References 

2011 murders in Iraq
21st-century mass murder in Iraq
Mass murder in 2011
Bombings in the Iraqi insurgency
Terrorist incidents in Iraq in 2011
History of Basra
November 2011 events in Iraq